The following squads were named for the 1976 Summer Olympics tournament.

Head coach: Cláudio Coutinho

Head coach: Colin Morris

Head coach: Sergio Padrón

Head coach: Georg Buschner

Head coach: Gabriel Robert

Head coach: Rubén Amorín

Head coach: Heshmat Mohajerani

Head coach: David Schweitzer

Head coach: Pak Doo-Ik

Head coach: Diego Mercado

Note: Mexican selections for the 1972 and 1976 Olympics consisted of entirely amateur players.

Head coach: Kazimierz Górski

Head coach: Ladislao Kubala

Head coach: Valeriy Lobanovskyi

References

External links
 FIFA
 RSSSF

Squads
1976 Summer Olympics